Carex anomoea is a species of sedge. Its native range is Nepal to China.

References 

anomoea
Flora of Nepal
Flora of China